The Education Act 1918 (8 & 9 Geo. V c. 39), often known as the Fisher Act, is an Act of the Parliament of the United Kingdom. It was drawn up by H. A. L. Fisher. Herbert Lewis, Parliamentary Secretary to the Board of Education, also played a key role in drawing up the Act. The Act applied only to England and Wales; a separate "Education (Scotland) Act 1918" applied for Scotland.

This raised the school leaving age to fourteen and planned to expand tertiary education. Other features of the 1918 Education Act included the provision of ancillary services (medical inspection, nursery schools, centres for pupils with special needs, etc.).

By the 1920s, the education of young children was of growing interest and concern to politicians, as well as to educationalists. As a result of this rising level of public debate, the Government of the day referred a number of topics for enquiry to the Consultative Committee of the Board of Education, then chaired by Sir William Henry Hadow. Altogether the Hadow Committee published three very important reports – 1926, 1931 and 1933.

These reports led to major changes in the structure of primary education. In particular, they resulted in separate and distinctive educational practice for children aged 5–7 (infants) and those aged 7–11 (juniors).

The Reports recommended child centred approaches and class sizes of no more than thirty. These recommendations marked a triumph of 'progressive' educational thought and practice over the more 'traditional' ideas and proved to be popular with many policy makers and teachers alike.

References

External links

Digital Reproduction of the Original Act on the Parliamentary Archives catalogue

United Kingdom Education Acts
1918 in education
1918 in law
United Kingdom Acts of Parliament 1918
Public education in the United Kingdom